This is a list of aquaria (public aquariums) in Japan.  For zoos, see List of zoos in Japan. Also, For worlds, see List of aquaria.

Aquariums are facilities where animals are confined within tanks and displayed to the public, and in which they may also be bred. Such facilities include public aquariums, oceanariums, marine mammal parks, and dolphinariums.

Attempts to operate the public aquarium began in 1882 with the aquarium "Uonozoki" in Ueno Zoo, and in 1899, the first private aquarium, the Asakusa Park Aquarium, opened. As of 2020, the oldest facility in Japan's aquarium is the Uozu Aquarium in Toyama, which opened in 1913. The first facility in the world to raise whale sharks and manta rays is in Japan.

Japan has the largest number of public aquariums per capita in the world.
There are many small public aquariums in Japan and many are not on this list.

In addition, large fish tanks are often installed at large commercial facilities, stations, and airports, such as Naha Airport, Ginza Sony Building, Aeon mall, Don Quijote, and Bay side place Hakata, all of which are open to the public for free.

Aichi Prefecture
 Hekinan Seaside Aquarium, Hekinan, Aichi
 Minamichita Beachland Aquarium, Mihama, Aichi
 Port of Nagoya Public Aquarium, Nagoya, Aichi
 Sea Life Nagoya, Nagoya, Aichi
 Takeshima Aquarium, Gamagōri, Aichi

Akita Prefecture
 Oga Aquarium Gao, Oga, Akita

Aomori Prefecture
 Aomori Prefectural Asamushi Aquarium, Aomori, Aomori

Chiba Prefecture
 the world's smallest aquarium, Choshi, Chiba
 Kamogawa Sea World, Kamogawa, Chiba

Ehime Prefecture
 Nijinomori Park Aquarium Osakanakan (The Aquarium of Shimantogawa River), Matsuno, Ehime

Fukui Prefecture
 Echizen Matsushima Aquarium, Sakai, Fukui

Fukuoka Prefecture
 Marine World Uminonakamichi, Fukuoka, Fukuoka

Fukushima Prefecture
 Aquamarine Fukushima, Iwaki, Fukushima
 Inawashiro Kingfisher Aquarium, Inawashiro, Fukushima

Gifu Prefecture
 Gifu World Freshwater Aquarium Aquatoto Gifu, Kakamigahara, Gifu
 Forest Aquarium, Takayama, Gifu

Hiroshima Prefecture
 Miyajima Public Aquarium (Marine Plaza Miyajima), Hatsukaichi, Hiroshima
 Fukuyama University Marine Biocenter Aquarium, Onomichi, Hiroshima
 Mariho Aquarium, Hiroshima, Hiroshima

Hokkaidō
 Otaru Aquarium, Otaru, Hokkaidō
 Wakkanai Noshappu Cold Aquarium, Wakkanai, Hokkaido
 Sun Piaza Aquarium, Sapporo, Hokkaido
 Sapporo Salmon Museum, Sapporo, Hokkaido
 Shibetsu Salmon Science Museum, Shibetsu, Hokkaido
 Noboribetsu Marine Park Nixe, Noboribetsu, Hokkaido
 kushiro Aquarium Pukupuku, kushiro, Hokkaido
 Chitose Salmon Museum, Chitose, Hokkaido
 Northern Daichi Aquarium, kitami, Hokkaido
 Muroran Aquarium, Muroran, Hokkaido

Hyōgo Prefecture
 Atoa, Kobe, Hyōgo
 Minatoyama Aquarium, Kobe, Hyōgo
 Kobe Municipal Suma Aqualife Park, Kobe, Hyōgo
 Kinosaki Marine World, Toyooka, Hyōgo
 Himeji Aquarium, Himeji, Hyōgo

Ibaraki Prefecture
 Aqua World, Oarai, Ibaraki
 Kasumigaura Aquarium, Kasumigaura, Ibaraki

Iwate Prefecture
 Kuji Underground Aquarium and Science Museum Moguranpia, Kuji, Iwate

Ishikawa Prefecture
 Notojima Aquarium, Notojima, Ishikawa

Kagawa Prefecture
 Shikoku Aquarium, Utazu
 New Yashima Aquarium, takamatsu

Kagoshima Prefecture
 Kagoshima Aquarium, Kagoshima
 Amami Ocean Exhibition Hall, Amami Ōshima

Kanagawa Prefecture
 Aquarium Sagamihara, Sagamihara, Kanagawa
 Hakone-en Aquarium, Hakonemachi, Kanagawa
 kawasaki Aquarium, kawasaki, Kanagawa
 Kitazato Aquarium Lab, Sagamihara, Kanagawa
 Enoshima Aquarium, Fujisawa, Kanagawa
 Yokohama Hakkeijima Sea Paradise, Yokohama, Kanagawa
 Makado Sea Marine Park (in Makado Elementary School), Yokohama, Kanagawa
 Yomiuri Land Seal Pavilion, Kawasaki, Kanagawa

Kōchi Prefecture
 Muroto Closed school Aquarium, Muroto, Kōchi
 Katsurahama Aquarium, Kōchi, Kōchi
 Ashizuri Ocean Aquarium, Tosashimizu, Kōchi

Kyoto Prefecture
 kyoto Aquarium, Kyoto
 Uocchikan, Miyazu, Kyoto

Kumamoto Prefecture
 Amakusa Aquarium, Dolphin World, Hondo, Kumamoto

Mie Prefecture
 Futami Seaparadise, Ise, Mie
 Shima Marineland, Shima, Mie
 Toba Aquarium, Toba, Mie

Miyagi Prefecture
 The Ice Aquarium, Kesennuma, Miyagi
 Sendai Umino-Mori Aquarium, Sendai

Miyazaki Prefecture
 Oyodo River Study Aquarium, Miyazaki, Miyazaki
 Dolphin Land, Kushima, Miyazaki
 Idenoyama Fresh Water Aquarium, Kobayashi, Miyazaki

Nagano Prefecture
 Alps Azumino National Government Park (Azumino school aquarium), Azumino, Nagano
 Tateshina Amusement Aquarium, Chino, Nagano

Nagasaki Prefecture
 Nagasaki Penguin Aquarium, Nagasaki
 Umi Kirara Saikai National Park Aquarium, Sasebo, Nagasaki
 Mutsugorou Aquarium, Isahaya, Nagasaki

Niigata Prefecture
 Joetsu Aquarium Umigatari, Joetsu, Niigata
 Niigata City Aquarium Marinpia Nihonkai, Niigata, Niigata
 Teradomari Aquarium, Teradomari, Niigata

Ōita Prefecture
 Marine Palace Oita Ecological Aquarium, Ōita, Ōita

Okayama Prefecture
 Tamano Marine Museum, Tamano, Okayama

Okinawa Prefecture
 Okinawa Churaumi Aquarium, Okinawa
 DMM kariyushi Aquarium, Okinawa

Osaka Prefecture
 Osaka Aquarium Kaiyukan, Osaka
 NIFREL, Osaka
 Osaka Water Museum and Aquarium, Osaka

Saitama Prefecture
 Saitama Aquarium, Hanyu, Saitama

Shiga Prefecture
 Lake Biwa Museum, Kusatsu, Shiga
 Miyazu Energy Laboratory Aquarium, Kyoto, Shiga

Shimane Prefecture
 Shimane Kaiyokan, Hamada, Shimane
 Shinjiko Nature Museum, GOBIUS, Hirata, Shimane

Shizuoka Prefecture
 Izu Andyland, Kawazu, Shizuoka
 Izu Mito Sea Paradise, Numazu, Shizuoka
 Numazu Deep Sea Aquarium, Numazu, Shizuoka
 Marine Science Museum, Tokai University, Shizuoka, Shizuoka
 Shimoda Floating Aquarium, Shimoda, Shizuoka

Tochigi Prefecture
 Nakagawa Aquatic Park, Tochigi, Tochigi

Tokyo
 Aqua Park Shinagawa, Minato, Tokyo
 Sunshine Aquarium, Toshima, Tokyo
 Tokyo Sea Life Park, Edogawa, Tokyo
 Shinagawa Aquarium, Shinagawa, Tokyo
 Sumida Aquarium, Sumida, Tokyo

Toyama Prefecture
 Uozu Aquarium, Uozu, Toyama

Wakayama Prefecture
 Adventure World, Shirahama, Wakayama
 Shirahama Aquarium, Shirahama, Wakayama
 Taiji Whale Museum, Taiji, Wakayama
 Kushimoto Marine Park Center, Kushimoto, Wakayama
 Wakayama Pref. Museum of Natural History, Kainan, Wakayama
 Susami Crustacean Aquarium, Susami, Wakayama

Yamagata Prefecture
 Tsuruoka Municipal Kamo Aquarium, Tsuruoka, Yamagata

Yamaguchi Prefecture
 Shimonoseki Municipal Aquarium Kaikyokan, Shimonoseki, Yamaguchi

Yamanashi Prefecture
 Fuji Yusui no Sato Aquarium, Oshino, Yamanashi

See also 
 List of aquaria
 List of botanical gardens
 List of dolphinariums
 List of tourist attractions worldwide
 List of zoos in Japan
 Marine mammal park

Notes

References 
 
 List of Aquariums in Japan

 
Japan
Aquaria
Aquaria